Briare (also known as Briare-le-Canal) is a commune in the Loiret department in north-central France, in the historical region of Puisaye. The composer and organist Henri Nibelle (1883–1967) was born in Briare.

Briare, the Brivodorum of the Romans is situated at the extremity of the Briare Canal, which unites the river Loire and its lateral canal with the Loing and so with the Seine.  The lateral canal of the Loire crosses the Loire near Briare by the Briare aqueduct which is 662 m long. Briare station has rail connections to Montargis, Nevers and Paris.

Population

See also
 Communes of the Loiret department
 Emaux de Briare the mosaic manufacturer which made the town double its size in the late 19th century.

References

External links

 Town council website

Communes of Loiret
Orléanais